Ramazan "The Punisher" Ramazanov (Russian: Рамазан Рамазанов; born June 22, 1984) is a  Russian kickboxer. He is a 7-time professional Muay Thai world champion.

Biography and career

Ramazan was born in Makhachkala, Dagestan, and started boxing when he was 13 years old. At the age of 15 he fell in love with Muay Thai. In 2004 he moved to Thailand with his cousins Arslan and Magomed Magomedov to pursue his Muay Thai career. He settled in Bangkok at Rompo Gym. Within a few years he moved up from the Super Middleweight to Super Cruiserweight division.

He had his first fight in Thailand at the age of 19 and won his first World title in 2004. On December 5, 2006, Ramazan participated in the S1 World Heavyweight tournament, held in Bangkok, Thailand, on the King's Birthday. Two decision victories over Emmanuel Payet and Jafar Ahmadi sent him to the finals, where he was able to defeat Belarusian Marek Dimitriov by low kicks in the second round.

One month later, on January 5, 2007, in Dubai, U.A.E. Ramazan stepped in the ring again and knocked out Dutchman Evert Fyeet in the fourth round to claim the WMC Middle East Title.

On December 8, 2007 in Sydney, Australia Ramazan stopped Steve McKinnon in the 4th round and claimed WMC Intercontinental Muay Thai Heavyweight title.

On July 19, 2008 in Cape Town, South Africa Ramazan became the new WPMF Heavyweight World Champion by beating Pete Motaung the local favorite of South Africa in the 2nd-round TKO win.

He defeated Fabian Gondorf by decision at Fight Nights: Battle of Moscow 9 on December 16, 2012.

Titles
 World Professional Muaythai Federation (WPMF)
 2012 WPMF World Heavyweight Champion (Phuket, Bangla stadium)
 2008 WPMF World Heavyweight Champion (Cape Town)
 2004 WPMF World Champion (Bangkok)
 World Muaythai Council (WMC)
 2007 WMC Intercontinental Muay Thai Heavyweight Champion (Sydney)
 2007 WMC Middle East Muay Thai Heavyweight Champion (Dubai)
 2005 WMC World Champion (Bangkok)
 Onesongchai Promotion
 2006 Winner of S-1 Heavyweight Tournament (Bangkok)
 PK-1
 2006 PK-1 World Champion (Phuket)
 King's Birthday
 2004 King's Birthday 83 kg Tournament Final (Bangkok)
 International Federation of Muaythai Associations (IFMA)
 2004 IFMA World Championship 🥉  75 kg
 2003 IFMA Russian Championship 🥇75 kg

Kickboxing record

|-
|-  bgcolor="#CCFFCC"
| 2012-12-16 || Win ||align=left| Fabian Gondorf || Fight Nights: Battle at Moscow 9 || Moscow, Russia || Decision || 3 ||3:00
|-  bgcolor="#CCFFCC"
| 2012-06-07 || Win ||align=left| Mamoudou Keta || Fight Nights: Battle of Moscow 7 || Moscow, Russia || Decision (Unanimous) || 3 || 3:00 
|-  bgcolor="#FFBBBB"
| 2012-03-08 || Loss ||align=left| Mamoudou Keta || Fight Nights: Battle of Moscow 6 || Moscow, Russia || KO (Right High Kick) || 2 ||  
|-  bgcolor="#CCFFCC"
| 2011-10-08 || Win ||align=left| Chris Knowles || Muay Thai Premier League: Second Round || Padua, Italy || KO ||  || 
|-  bgcolor="#FFBBBB"
| 2011-02-05 || Loss ||align=left| Wendell Roche || Enfusion Kickboxing Tournament '11, 2nd Round || Koh Samui, Thailand || Ext.R Decision || 4 || 3:00 
|-  bgcolor="#CCFFCC"
| 2011-02-01 || Win ||align=left| Revanho Blokland || Enfusion Kickboxing Tournament '11, 2nd Round || Koh Samui, Thailand || KO (Punches) || 2 || 
|-  bgcolor="#FFBBBB"
| 2010-07-29 || Loss ||align=left| Vitali Akhramenko || Tatneft Arena World Cup 2010 final (+80 kg) || Kazan, Russia || Decision || 3 || 3:00
|-  bgcolor="#c5d2ea"
| 2010-06-11 || NC ||align=left| Alain Ngalani || Planet Battle VI || Wanchai, Hong Kong ||No Contest || 2 || 
|-  bgcolor="#CCFFCC"
| 2010-05-21 || Win ||align=left| || Fury I - Clash of the Titans || Macau || TKO || 1 || 
|-  bgcolor="#CCFFCC"
| 2010-04-30 || Win ||align=left| Dmitri Bezus || Tatneft Arena World Cup 2010 final (+80 kg) || Kazan, Russia || Decision (Unanimous) || 3 || 3:00
|-  bgcolor="#CCFFCC"
| 2010-02-10 || Win ||align=left| Carlos Correa || Tatneft Arena World Cup 2010 final (+80 kg) || Kazan, Russia || Decision (Unanimous) || 3 || 3:00
|-  bgcolor="#CCFFCC"
| 2010-01-16 || Win ||align=left| Eduardo Maiorino || Thailand vs Challenger Series, Royal Paragon Hall || Bangkok, Thailand || KO (Right high kick) || 1 || 
|-  bgcolor="#CCFFCC"
| 2009-11-07 || Win ||align=left| Nemanja Ulardzic || I-1 World Muaythai Grand Extreme || Macau || Decision (Unanimous) || 3 || 3:00
|-  bgcolor="#FFBBBB"
| 2009-08-11 || Loss ||align=left| Melvin Manhoef || K-1 World Grand Prix 2009 in Tokyo Final 16 Qualifying GP || Tokyo, Japan || KO (Punch) || 1 || 2:16
|-  bgcolor="#CCFFCC"
| 2009-06-04 || Win ||align=left| Ryuta Noji || Planet Battle Queen Elizabeth Stadium || Wanchai, Hong Kong || Decision (Unanimous) || 3 || 3:00
|-  bgcolor="#CCFFCC"
| 2008-10-04 || Win ||align=left| Chris Braveheart || Battle To Be King, Fairtex Thepprasit Stadium || Pattaya, Thailand || KO (Low kicks) || 2 ||
|-  bgcolor="#CCFFCC"
| 2008-07-19 || Win ||align=left| Pete Motaung|| Sons of Africa, WPMF Heavyweight title 95 kg+ || Cape Town, South Africa || TKO (Knee) || 2 ||
|-
! style=background:white colspan=9 |
|-
|-  bgcolor="#FFBBBB"
| 2008-03-29 || Loss ||align=left| Ben Edwards || Xplosion 18 Super Fights || Sydney, Australia || KO (Hook) || 2 ||
|-  bgcolor="#CCFFCC"
| 2007-12-27 || Win ||align=left| Yoann Gouaida || Battle on Bali FC || Bali, Indonesia || KO (Punches) || 5 ||
|-  bgcolor="#CCFFCC"
| 2007-12-08 || Win ||align=left| Steve McKinnon || Xplosion 17, WMC Intercontinental title 95 kg || Sydney, Australia || KO (Right hook) || 4 || 2:51
|-
! style=background:white colspan=9 |
|-
|-  bgcolor="#CCFFCC"
| 2007-06-02 || Win ||align=left| Marek Dimitriov || Fury in Macau || Macau || KO (Left hook) || 3 || 0:42
|-  bgcolor="#FFBBBB"
| 2007-05-19 || Loss ||align=left| Teodor Sariyev || K-1 Scandinavia GP 2007 || Stockholm, Sweden || KO (Right hook) || 2 || 0:57
|-  bgcolor="#CCFFCC"
| 2007-04-30 || Win ||align=left| Baek Si Wang || WMC I-1 World Muaythai Grand Prix 2007 || Wanchai, Hong Kong || KO (Low kicks) || 2 ||
|-  bgcolor="#CCFFCC"
| 2007-01-04 || Win ||align=left| Evert Fyeet || War On The Shore Episode-1 || Dubai, U.A.E. || KO (Low kicks) || 4 ||
|-
! style=background:white colspan=9 |
|-
|-  bgcolor="#CCFFCC"
| 2006-12-05 || Win ||align=left| Marek Dimitriov || King's Cup WMC S-1 Heavyweight Tournament || Bangkok, Thailand || Decision || 3 || 3:00
|-
! style=background:white colspan=9 |
|-
|-  bgcolor="#CCFFCC"
| 2006-12-05 || Win ||align=left| Jafar Ahmadi || King's Cup WMC S-1 Heavyweight Tournament || Bangkok, Thailand || Decision || 3 || 3:00
|-  bgcolor="#CCFFCC"
| 2006-12-05 || Win ||align=left| Emmanuel Payet || King's Cup WMC S-1 Heavyweight Tournament || Bangkok, Thailand || Decision || 3 || 3:00
|-  bgcolor="#CCFFCC"
| 2006-11-11 || Win ||align=left| Shin Kyum Kim || Macau Xplosion || Macau || KO (Spinning elbow) || 2 || 1:30
|-  bgcolor="#CCFFCC"
| 2006-08-18 || Win ||align=left| Will Riva || Xplosion || Sydney, Australia || KO || 1 ||
|-  bgcolor="#CCFFCC"
| 2006-04-12 || Win ||align=left| Ekapon || Theprasit Stadium || Pattaya, Thailand || KO (Left hook) || 1 || 0:30
|-  bgcolor="#FFBBBB"
| 2005-12-05 || Loss ||align=left| Stephan Thomas || King's Cup S-1 World Championship || Bangkok, Thailand || Decision || 5 || 3:00
|-  bgcolor="#FFBBBB"
| 2005-11-18 || Loss ||align=left| Jan Antolik || Philip Lam & Lee Gar 30th Anniversary || Auckland, New Zealand || Decision || 5 || 3:00
|-  bgcolor="#CCFFCC"
| 2005-10-28 || Win ||align=left| Leonard Sitpholek || Lumpinee Stadium || Bangkok, Thailand || Decision || 5 || 3:00
|-  bgcolor="#CCFFCC"
| 2005-07-23 || Win ||align=left| Warren Elson || Muay Thai Warriors Supa Fight 3 || Sunshine Coast, Australia || Decision || 5 || 3:00
|-  bgcolor="#FFBBBB"
| 2005-06-24 || Loss ||align=left| Jan Antolik || NZ vs Russia & Thailand || Auckland, New Zealand || Decision || 5 || 3:00
|-  bgcolor="#CCFFCC"
| 2005-06-19 || Win ||align=left| Wanlop Sitpholek || Thammasat University || Bangkok, Thailand || Decision || 5 || 3:00
|-  bgcolor="#FFBBBB"
| 2005-02-12 || Loss ||align=left| Chaowalit Jockygym || Songchai Tsunami Event || Bangkok, Thailand || Decision || 5 || 3:00
|-  bgcolor="#FFBBBB"
| 2004-12-18 || Loss ||align=left| Shane Chapman || K-1 Challenge 2004 Oceania vs World || Gold Coast, Australia || Decision || 3 || 3:00
|-  bgcolor="#CCFFCC"
| 2004-12-05 || Win ||align=left| Makadam || King's Birthday 2004 || Bangkok, Thailand || Decision || 3 || 3:00
|-
! style=background:white colspan=9 |
|-
|-  bgcolor="#CCFFCC"
| 2004-12-05 || Win ||align=left| Fredrik Rosenberg || King's Birthday 2004 || Bangkok, Thailand || TKO || 1 ||
|-  bgcolor="#FFBBBB"
| 2004-11-23 || Loss ||align=left| Apichai To Papadang || Lumpinee Muaythai Gala 2 || Helsinki, Finland || Decision || 5 || 3:00
|-  bgcolor="#CCFFCC"
| 2004-10-09 || Win ||align=left| Leonard Sitpholek || Muaythailumpineekrikkri Fights, Lumpinee Stadium || Bangkok, Thailand || Decision || 5 || 3:00
|-
| colspan=9 | Legend:

See also
 List of male kickboxers
 List of K-1 events

References

External links
Profile at K-1

Living people
1984 births
Russian male kickboxers
Heavyweight kickboxers
Russian Muay Thai practitioners
Sportspeople from Makhachkala
Russian expatriate sportspeople in Thailand